Marino Paul Pieretti (September 23, 1920 – January 30, 1981) was an Italian-born American professional baseball player. Born in Lucca, in Tuscany, he grew up in San Francisco's North Beach district. He was a right-handed pitcher who appeared in 194 games, 68 as a starter, in the Major Leagues from  through  for the Washington Senators, Chicago White Sox, and Cleveland Indians.

A stalwart in the Pacific Coast League of the era (he won 122 games and lost 112 for various PCL teams between 1943 and 1956), he came to the Majors after winning 26 games for the 1944 Portland Beavers. He was known as "Submariner" in his stint with the Beavers because of his sidewinder delivery.

His rookie season was his finest. Pitching for the second-place Senators, he won 14 of 27 decisions and completed 14 of his 27 starting assignments, hurling three shutouts.  For his MLB career, he compiled a 30–38 record with an earned run average of 4.53 in 673⅔ innings pitched, allowing 713 hits and 321 bases on balls. He notched 188 career strikeouts, eight saves and 21 complete games.

Pieretti, who worked in a slaughterhouse in the offseason, lived in San Francisco after his playing days. When he was stricken with cancer in the mid-1970s, his friends — many of them former baseball players from the Bay Area — organized "The Friends of Marino Pieretti" to buoy his spirits. Pieretti's health improved for a time, and he was able to attend regular meetings until his death at age 60 early in 1981. However, The Friends of Marino Pieretti were still meeting in his honor every month as of January 2011.

References

External links

1920 births
1981 deaths
Baseball players from San Francisco
Chicago White Sox players
Cleveland Indians players
Des Moines Bruins players
El Paso Texans players
Los Angeles Angels (minor league) players
Major League Baseball pitchers
Major League Baseball players from Italy
Modesto Reds players
Portland Beavers players
Sacramento Solons players
Washington Senators (1901–1960) players